Rosinidin is an O-methylated anthocyanidin derived from Cyanidin. It is a pigment found in the flowers of Catharanthus roseus and, in lower concentration, in Primula rosea.

References

External links 
 Rosinidin at sci-toys.com

O-methylated anthocyanidins